Leuronoma magna is a moth of the family Gelechiidae. It was described by Anthonie Johannes Theodorus Janse in 1958. It is found in South Africa and Zimbabwe.

References

Moths described in 1958
Leuronoma